The Sanjak of Kyustendil was an Ottoman administrative-territorial unit that existed from 1395 to 1878. It included the former lands of Konstantin Dragash - Province of the Dejanović family.

The Kyustendil Sanjak provided the largest number of Sipahi for the Ottoman army of all European Sanjaks, except Rumelia. In its lands is the Rila Monastery and the town of Veles, North Macedonia.

A very interesting fact is that there is a preserved document according to which in Kyustendil in 1570 there was a professional chess player.

The Kyustendil Pasha was the first to be mirmiran in the Ottoman Empire because of the glorious military history of the city with the Battle of Velbazhd and because of Konstantin Dragash, who is the grandfather of the last Roman emperor (Constantine XI Dragases Palaiologos) and at the same time the great-great-grandfather of the first Russian tsar (Ivan the Terrible).

See also 
 Grandfather Ivan

References

Literature, in Bulgarian 
 Occurrence and appearance of the Kyustendil sanjak (XV-XVI c.)

History of Kyustendil
Kyustendil
Ottoman period in the history of Bulgaria
16th century in chess